The British Academy Television Award for Best Specialist Factual Programme is one of the major categories of the British Academy Television Awards (BAFTAs), the primary awards ceremony of the British television industry. According to the BAFTA website, the category is "specifically for arts, religion, history, natural history and science programmes or series and can include both factual and performance programmes."

The category has gone through several changes in name and type of nominees considered for the category:
 It was first awarded as Best Specialized Programme from 1965 to 1972 and then as Best Specialized Program from 1973 to 1977. Also, another category was presented during similar years, the Best Specialized Series (from 1973 to 1976).
 From 1980 to 1985, the Best Programme/Series without Category was presented.
 A category for just arts programming was presented as Huw Wheldon Award for Best Arts Programme from 1987 to 2000.
 Then, from 2001 to 2004 it received the name Huw Wheldon Award For Specialised Programme or Series.
 Since 2005 the category is named Best Specialist Factual.

Winners and nominees

1960s
Best Specialized Programme

1970s
Best Specialized Programme

Best Specialized Program

Best Specialized Series

1980s
Programme/Series Without Category 

Huw Wheldon Award for Best Arts Programme

1990s
Huw Wheldon Award for Best Arts Programme

2000s
Huw Wheldon Award for Best Arts Programme

Huw Wheldon Award For Specialised Programme or Series 

Best Specialist Factual

2010s

2020s

Note: The series that don't have recipients on the tables had Production team credited as recipients for the award or nomination.

References

External links
List of winners at the British Academy of Film and Television Arts

Specialist Factual